Kastania is a village in Servia municipality, Kozani regional unit, in the Greek region of Macedonia. The postal code is 50500, while the telephone code is +30 24640. At the 2011 census the population was 565. 

The Monastery of Agioi Theodoroi at Kastania and the Byzantium Monastery of St. Antonios Siapkas are both located in Kastania.

References

External links
 Photo at panoramio.com
 Servis Kiralama

Populated places in Kozani (regional unit)